Bonu (also Romanized as Bonū and Bon Now; also known as Būnnā and Būnnū) is a village in Pir Sohrab Rural District, in the Central District of Chabahar County, Sistan and Baluchestan Province, Iran. At the 2006 census, its population was 243, in 41 families.

References 

Populated places in Chabahar County